Ptychosperma is a genus of flowering plant in the family Arecaceae. Most are native to Australia and/or New Guinea, with a few in the Solomon Islands and in Maluku Province of eastern Indonesia. Some have been cultivated abroad as house or garden plants, and reportedly naturalized in certain regions (Caribbean, Polynesia, Fiji, Florida).

Species 
It contains the following species:
 Ptychosperma ambiguum (Becc.) Becc. ex Martelli – western New Guinea
 Ptychosperma buabe Essig – Papua New Guinea
 Ptychosperma burretianum Essig – D'Entrecasteaux Islands
 Ptychosperma caryotoides Ridl. – Papua New Guinea
 Ptychosperma cuneatum (Burret) Burret – New Guinea
 Ptychosperma elegans (R.Br.) Blume – Queensland; naturalized in Florida, Polynesia, Dominican Republic
 Ptychosperma furcatum (Becc.) Becc. ex Martelli – Papua New Guinea
 Ptychosperma gracile Labill. – Bismarck Archipelago
 Ptychosperma halmaherense Heatubun – Maluku → Jailoloa halmaherensis
 Ptychosperma hartmannii Becc. – New Guinea
 Ptychosperma lauterbachii Becc. – Papua New Guinea
 Ptychosperma lineare (Burret) Burret – Papua New Guinea
 Ptychosperma macarthurii (H.Wendl. ex H.J.Veitch) H.Wendl. ex Hook.f. – New Guinea, Queensland, Northern Territory
 Ptychosperma macrocerum Becc. – New Guinea
 Ptychosperma mambare (F.M.Bailey) Becc. ex Martelli – Papua New Guinea
 Ptychosperma microcarpum (Burret) Burret – Papua New Guinea
 Ptychosperma mooreanum Essig – New Guinea
 Ptychosperma nicolai (Sander ex André) Burret – New Guinea
 Ptychosperma praemorsum Becc. – New Guinea
 Ptychosperma propinquum (Becc.) Becc. ex Martelli – Aru Islands, Salawati Island, Kai Islands
 Ptychosperma pullenii Essig – Papua New Guinea
 Ptychosperma ramosissimum Essig – Louisiade Archipelago
 Ptychosperma rosselense Essig – Papua New Guinea
 Ptychosperma salomonense Burret – Papua New Guinea, Solomon Islands
 Ptychosperma sanderianum Ridl. – Papua New Guinea
 Ptychosperma schefferi Becc. ex Martelli – New Guinea
 Ptychosperma streimannii Essig – Papua New Guinea
 Ptychosperma tagulense Essig – Louisiade Archipelago
 Ptychosperma vestitum Essig – Papua New Guinea
 Ptychosperma waitianum Essig – Papua New Guinea

References

 
Arecaceae genera
Taxonomy articles created by Polbot